Grey-collar refers to the balance of employed people not classified as white- or blue collar. It is occasionally used to describe elderly individuals working beyond the age of retirement, as well as those occupations that incorporate some of the elements of both blue- and white-collar, and generally are in between the two categories in terms of income-earning capability.

Grey-collar workers often have licenses, associate degrees, certificates or diplomas from a trade school or technical school in a particular field. They are unlike blue-collar workers, who can often be trained on the job within several weeks, whereas grey-collar workers already have a specific skill set and require more specialized knowledge than their blue-collar counterparts.

The fields that most recognize the differences between these two groups are human resources and the insurance industry. These different groups must be insured differently for liability, as the potential for injury is different.

Examples
Example occupations:

Other definitions
The Pittsburgh Post-Gazette wrote that another definition for grey collar could be the underemployed white collar worker.

Charle Brecher of the Citizens Budget Commission and the Partnership for New York City defined it sub-blue-collar jobs: "maintenance and custodial".

See also

Designation of workers by collar color

References

External links

Social classes
Employment classifications